Democratic Front of National Unity (in Spanish: Frente Democrático de Unidad Nacional), was a political party in Peru founded in 1984 in order to launch the presidential campaign of the ex-president Francisco Morales Bermúdez.

1984 establishments in Peru
Defunct political parties in Peru
Political parties established in 1984
Political parties with year of disestablishment missing